West Newark Congregational Church and Cemetery is a historic Congregational church and cemetery located at Newark Valley in Tioga County, New York.  It is a Greek Revival style, front gabled frame structure built in 1848.  The front facade features a large square bell tower centered in the gable ridge. Also on the property is a cemetery dating to the 1820s with burials in all subsequent eras.

It was listed on the National Register of Historic Places in 1998.

References

Churches on the National Register of Historic Places in New York (state)
Cemeteries on the National Register of Historic Places in New York (state)
Churches completed in 1848
19th-century churches in the United States
Churches in Tioga County, New York
Cemeteries in Tioga County, New York
National Register of Historic Places in Tioga County, New York
Congregational churches in New York (state)